Romnensky District is an administrative and municipal district (raion), one of the twenty in Amur Oblast, Russia. Its administrative center is the rural locality (a selo) of Romny. Population:  11,822 (2002 Census);  The population of Romny accounts for 32.8% of the district's total population.

References

Notes

Sources

Districts of Amur Oblast